Cardinal Orsini may refer to:

 Alessandro Orsini (cardinal) (1592–1626), cardinal 1615–26
 Domenico Orsini d'Aragona (1719–89), cardinal 1743–89
 Flavio Orsini (1532–81), cardinal 1565–81
 Francesco Napoleone Orsini (died 1312), cardinal 1295–1312; a cardinal elector at the 1304–1305 papal conclave
 Franciotto Orsini (1473–1534), cardinal 1517–34

 Giordano Orsini (died 1287), cardinal 1278–87
 Giordano Orsini (died 1438), cardinal 1405–38
 Jordan of Santa Susanna (Giordano Bobone Orsini, died after 1154), cardinal from 1144
 Giambattista Orsini (died 1503), cardinal 1483–1503
 Giovanni Orsini (died 1280), cardinal from 1243 and Pope Nicholas III from 1277
 Giovanni Gaetano Orsini (died 1335), cardinal 1316–35
 Latino Orsini (1411–77), cardinal 1448–77
 Latino Malabranca Orsini (died 1294), cardinal 1278–94

 Matteo Orsini (died 1340), cardinal 1327–40
 Napoleone Orsini Frangipani (1263–1342), cardinal 1288–1342

 Rinaldo Orsini (cardinal) (died 1374), cardinal 1350–74; a participant in the 1352 papal conclave
 Tommaso Orsini (died 1390), cardinal ca. 1383–90
 Vincenzo Maria Orsini (1650–1730), cardinal from 1672 and Pope Benedict XIII from 1724
 Virginio Orsini (cardinal) (1615–76), cardinal 1641–76